Darius Mutamba is a conceptual visual artist from Zimbabwe. He is a journalist who has worked as a photojournalist for local news papers Daily News, Daily News on Sunday, and The Weekend Post. He also works as a production assistant for The Financial Gazette.

Controversy
In the month of June 2016 Mutamba curated a controversial Photography exhibition in Harare entitled Object of Desire which focused on the nude human form. In support of his work he comments that nudity expresses "our common and universal element as humans." In 2014 his work Silent Voices, a collection of 15 black and white photographs on canvas depicting Zimbabwean children, was exhibited at the Harare International Festival of the Arts.

References

External links
 Darius Mutamba at Talenthouse

Zimbabwean photographers
Zimbabwean artists
1991 births
Living people